Robert, Rob, Bob, or Bobby West may refer to:

Robert West (chemist) (born 1928), American professor of chemistry at the University of Wisconsin–Madison
Robert West (painter) (died 1770), Irish artist, draughtsman, and teacher
Robert West (politician) (born 1955), BNP politician and founder of the Christian Council of Britain
Robert West (boxer) (born 1967), American boxer
Bob West (born 1956), American actor
Bob West, character in 1977 British comedy Adventures of a Private Eye
Rob West, a candidate in the Ontario New Democratic Party candidates, 1987 Ontario provincial election
Robbie West (born 1969), Australian rules footballer
Bobby West (boxer), American boxer, opponent of Mark Kaylor in 1983
Bobby West (musician), Pianist/composer on 1972 American album A Possible Projection of the Future / Childhood's End
Robert West (American football) (born 1950), American football player

See also
Robert Sackville-West (born 1958), British baron and publisher
Bob Schoolley-West (1937–2012), British police officer and philatelist
Red West (Robert Gene West, 1936–2017), American actor

References